Danilo de Fausto Lins (born 23 May 1986) is a Brazilian footballer who currently plays for Liga de Elite side Chao Pak Kei.

Career statistics

Club

Notes

References

1986 births
Living people
Brazilian footballers
Brazilian expatriate footballers
Association football forwards
Campeonato Brasileiro Série B players
Campeonato Brasileiro Série A players
Clube Náutico Capibaribe players
Guarani Esporte Clube (MG) players
San Martín de San Juan footballers
Mogi Mirim Esporte Clube players
East Riffa Club players
Araripina Futebol Clube players
Resende Futebol Clube players
Central Sport Club players
Clube do Remo players
Clube Recreativo e Atlético Catalano players
Grêmio Esportivo Juventus players
Associação Desportiva Recreativa e Cultural Icasa players
Madureira Esporte Clube players
Guarani Esporte Clube (CE) players
Clube Sociedade Esportiva players
Brazilian expatriate sportspeople in Argentina
Expatriate footballers in Argentina
Brazilian expatriate sportspeople in Bahrain
Expatriate footballers in Bahrain
Brazilian expatriate sportspeople in Macau
Expatriate footballers in Macau
Sportspeople from Recife
Liga de Elite players